Events from the year 1976 in the United Arab Emirates.

Incumbents
President: Zayed bin Sultan Al Nahyan 
Prime Minister: Maktoum bin Rashid Al Maktoum

Establishments

Abu Dhabi Crown Prince's Court.
Abu Dhabi Investment Authority.

References

 
Years of the 20th century in the United Arab Emirates
United Arab Emirates
United Arab Emirates
1970s in the United Arab Emirates